David Lawrence Wilkerson (born January 6, 1969) is an American politician and Certified Public Accountant from the state of Georgia. A member of the Democratic Party, Wilkerson has served in the Georgia House of Representatives since 2011 and as the Minority Whip since 2021.

In February 2019, Wilkerson was unanimously elected chair of the Cobb County legislative delegation, following a period of dispute after the county's shift from Republican to Democratic in the 2018 midterm elections.

References

External links
 
Legislative page
Twitter account

Living people
Democratic Party members of the Georgia House of Representatives
People from Fort Dix
People from Austell, Georgia
21st-century American politicians
1969 births
African-American state legislators in Georgia (U.S. state)
21st-century African-American politicians
20th-century African-American people